Depending on the author, Bézier spline may refer to:
 a Bézier curve or
 a composite Bézier curve

Mathematics disambiguation pages